Paranerita peninsulata is a moth of the subfamily Arctiinae. It was described by Paul Dognin in 1914. It is found in Venezuela.

References

Paranerita
Moths described in 1914